Admiral Island may refer to: 

Admiral Island (South Africa) 
Admiral Island (Western Australia)